Dan Söderström (born April 5, 1948 in Horndal, Sweden) is a retired professional ice hockey player who played in the Elitserien.  He played for Leksands IF.  He won a bronze medal at the 1980 Winter Olympics.

External links

1948 births
Living people
Ice hockey players at the 1980 Winter Olympics
Leksands IF players
Olympic bronze medalists for Sweden
Olympic ice hockey players of Sweden
Olympic medalists in ice hockey
People from Avesta Municipality
Swedish ice hockey right wingers
Sportspeople from Dalarna County